The 1917–18 İstanbul Football League season was the 13th season of the league. Altınordu İdman Yurdu SK won the league for the second time. NB: 3-2-1 point system.

Season

References
 Dağlaroğlu, Rüştü. Fenerbahçe Spor Kulübü Tarihi 1907-1957

Istanbul Football League seasons
Istanbul
Istanbul